Ian Galliguez (born December 11, 1975) is a Filipino actress known for her comedic role in the television show Labs Ko Si Babe. She has appeared on numerous shows on ABS-CBN.
Galliguez is of a mixed descent with Spanish, Portuguese, Chinese and Filipino ancestry. She is the mother of one girl and twin boys.

Background
Before acting on television and movies, Galliguez was a Theatre actress and an English teacher. She has a degree in Mass Communications from St. Scholastica's College in Manila.

Career
She was seen on Princess and I,  playing Noemi - a Drukpah from the Kingdom of Yang Don.

Galliguez was on Guns and Roses, as Axl, the police 'partner' and best friend of Onat Marasigan, who is played by Ejay Falcon.
She was seen on Magkaribal, playing Cora, the market stall owner who was transformed into a runway supermodel. Ian's past appearances on primetime TV also include Rosalka, Pangako Sa 'Yo, Detour, Maalaala Mo Kaya and Only You.

On the silver screen, Ian has appeared in a movie with Aga Muhlach and Joyce Jimenez in the comedy Narinig Mo na ba ang Latest?, directed by Joey Reyes. She has also featured on two award-winning independent films - Blood Bank and Paano Ko Sasabihin?.

In 2018, she came back on showbiz and did Playhouse and Parasite Island as her comeback Kapamilya projects.

Other works
In March 2010, Ian started an online travel magazine focused on the local market - DiscoverPH.com. She is now the writer and owner of PinayGadabout.com.

Ian also contributes to local glossy magazines for travel and lifestyle features. She is also an agent and publicist.

Filmography

Movies
Catch Me... I'm in Love (2011) - Girlie (as Ian Russell Victor)
Bulong (2011) - E.R. Doctor (as Ian 'Duday' Galiguez)
Paano Ko Sasabihin? (2009) - Pixie (as Ian Viktor)
Blood Bank (2005 short film) - (as Ian Victor)
Narinig mo na ba ang l8est? (2001) - Noemi (as Ian' Duday' Galliguez)

Television
 Parasite Island (2019) - Whitney
 Playhouse (2018) - Mitchie de Vera
 Hawak Kamay (2014)
 Be Careful With My Heart (2013) - Applicant
 Princess and I (2012) - Noemi
 Maalaala Mo Kaya (2012) - Marie (Kalendaryo episode)
 Guns N' Roses (2011) - Axl Navarro
 Magkaribal (2010) - Cora
 Rosalka (2010) - Juvy 
 Only You (2009) - China
 Super Inggo 1.5 Ang Bagong Bangis (2007) - Sheryl
 Pangarap na Bituin (2005) - Manang
 G-mik (2001) - School Principal
 Pangako sa 'Yo (2001) - Chinee
 Tabing Ilog (2000) - Sabrina
 Labs Ko Si Babe (2000) - Duday
 Mara Clara (1993-1997) - Bekya

Notes

External links

Ian Galliguez Homepage

1975 births
Living people
Filipino film actresses
Star Magic
St. Scholastica's College Manila alumni
Filipino television actresses